The 2008–09 Wisconsin Badgers men's basketball team represented the University of Wisconsin–Madison. The head coach was Bo Ryan, coaching his eighth season with the Badgers. The team played its home games at the Kohl Center in Madison, Wisconsin, and was a member of the Big Ten Conference.

Awards 
All-Big Ten by Media
 Marcus Landry – 3rd team
 Trevon Hughes – Honorable mentioned
 Joe Krabbenhoft – Honorable mentioned

All-Big Ten by Coaches
 Marcus Landry – 2nd team
 Trevon Hughes – Honorable mentioned

Roster

2008–09 Schedule and Results 
 All times are Central

|-
!colspan=12 style=|Regular Season

|-
!colspan=12 style=|Big Ten tournament 

|-
!colspan=12 style=|NCAA Tournament

Rankings

References 

Wisconsin
Wisconsin
Wisconsin Badgers men's basketball seasons
Badge
Badge